Ekaterina Makarova and Elena Vesnina were the defending champions, but lost to Hsieh Su-wei and Peng Shuai in the semifinals.

Chan Hao-ching and Yang Zhaoxuan won the title, defeating Hsieh and Peng in the final, 4–6, 6–2, [10–6].

Seeds

Draw

Draw

References
Main Draw

Dubai Tennis Championships - Doubles
Women's Doubles